The 2011 European Mountain Running Championships were held on 10 July at Uludağ in Bursa, Turkey. They were that year's area championships for mountain running, held by the European Athletic Association in conjunction with the Turkish Athletic Federation. The competition featured four races, with senior and junior races for both men and women. A total of 221 runners from 26 nations started the competition.

The men's race was 12.0 km long and featured an ascent of 1,245 m. The women's and junior men's races were 8.5 km long comprising a rise of 865 m. The junior women's race was 3.5 km over a hill of 405 m.

Ahmet Arslan from Turkey took his fifth consecutive men's title, while Swiss Martina Strahl won the gold medal in senior women's category. Italian senior men's and senior women's teams were the champions. In the junior men's category, Turkish Nuri Kömür became the champion followed by two of his countrymen. Denisa Ionela Dragomir from Romania was the gold medalist in junior women's race. Turkish junior men's and junior women's teams took the gold medals in team ranking.

The event was dominated by the host nation Turkey, which won in total nine medals (four gold, three silver and two bronze) in three categories. It was the senior women's race, at which Turkey was not able to win any medal.

Results

Men

Totals: 78 starters, 74 finishers, 17 national teams. Jose Gaspar, who had finished third, was disqualified for a doping offence.

Women

Totals: 57 starters, 54 finishers, 12 national teams.

Junior men

Totals: 54 starters, 54 finishers, 12 national teams.

Junior women

Totals: 32 starters, 32 finishers, 10 national teams.

Participation
A total of 26 nations had athletes, which took part in the 2011 Championships.

References

External links
Official website
European Athletics competition page

European Mountain Running Championships
European Mountain
European Mountain Running Championships
European Mountain Running Championships
International athletics competitions hosted by Turkey
Sport in Bursa